Pablo Carreño Busta was the defending champion but chose not to participate.

Radu Albot won the title, beating Clément Geens in the final, 6–2, 6–4.

Seeds

Draw

Finals

Top half

Bottom half

External Links
 Main Draw
 Qualifying Draw

Poznan Open - Singles
2016 Singles